The 1937 All-Ireland Senior Camogie Championship was the high point of the 1937 season in Camogie. The championship was won by Dublin, who defeated Galway by a 25-point margin in the final on front of what the Irish Independent reported was one of the biggest crowds ever at a camogie match.

Structure
Dublin beat Louth 5–0 to 1–3 in the Leinster semi-final and Meath 6–3 to 1–1 in the final. Antrim beat surprise finalists Monaghan 4–2 to 0–2 in the Ulster final. Galway beat Sligo by 4–0 to 1–2 in the sparsely attended Connacht final in Castlerea. Galway led Antrim by 2–0 to 1–2 at half time in the semi–final, then Antrim’s Winnifred Storey equalised with ten minutes to go. As the Irish Press reported:
Unfortunately for Antrim the excitement seemed to spread to some of their players. They spoiled chances through over eagerness and their marking was not so keen. Galway took their chance and two quick goals from Celia Mulholland and Mary Joyce settled the issue, although Winnie Storey got another goal for Antrim just before the end. Thanks to their livelier forwards and their cleaner and more accurate striking Galway qualified for the All Ireland camóguidheacht final.

Final
Jean Hannon and Angela Egan had Dublin two goals up within three minutes of the start of the final. Eveleen O'Beirne pulled a goal back for Galway but they never recovered. The Connacht Sentinel reported that Galway "were best served by Jo Melvin in the goal who drew frequent rounds of applause for her saves".

Final stages

 
Match Rules
50 minutes
Replay if scores level
Maximum of 3 substitutions

See also
 All-Ireland Senior Hurling Championship
 Wikipedia List of Camogie players
 National Camogie League
 Camogie All Stars Awards
 Ashbourne Cup

References

External links
 Camogie Association
 Historical reports of All Ireland finals
 All-Ireland Senior Camogie Championship: Roll of Honour
 Camogie on facebook
 Camogie on GAA Oral History Project

1937 in camogie
1937